Lotte Salling is a Danish writer born on February 9, 1964, in Århus, Denmark. She writes short stories for young children.

Bibliography 
 Trolderim
 Mit stamtræ
 Hvad brugte vi ilden til ?
 Gud, Thor og oldemor - og de andre oppe i himlen
 Peter Puslespil
 Sørøver Søren og andre alfabetrim
 Tyve Trætte Trolde
 En Hest i Rom
 Grummerim
 Slotsmusene
 Skøre Line
 Bager Basse og andre børnerim
 Fies Far
 1. b
 1. b i byen
 Vilfred og verdens værste vikinger
 Aktive eventyr

References 

Danish children's writers
Danish women writers
People from Aarhus
1964 births
Living people
Danish women children's writers